Eudóxio César Azedo Gneco (June 21, 1849 in , Benavente – June 29, 1911 in Lisbon), better known as Azedo Gneco, was an Italian-Portuguese engraver, medalist, apprentice sculptor and political activist. An orator and journalist, he was one of the founders of the Portuguese Socialist Party in 1875 and one of its first leaders. 

With international ties to Spain and the Caribbean he was able to connect various groups through his work.  He led the Association of Workers of the Portuguese Region (Portuguese: Associação dos Trabalhadores da Região Portuguesa—ATRP), formed in 1873, and the National Confederation of Class Associations (Portuguese:Confederação Nacional das Associaçoes de Classe—CNAC), which was formed in 1894 and united thirty-seven labour unions.

References 

1849 births
1911 deaths
Portuguese politicians

Portuguese people of Italian descent